Boston Magazine may refer to:

 Boston Magazine (1783-1786)
 Boston Weekly Magazine (1802-1808)
 Boston Monthly Magazine (1825-1826)
 Boston magazine, ca.1970-present